A list of animated feature films released in 2008.

Released films

Box office collection

See also
 List of animated television series of 2008

References

 Feature films
2008
2008-related lists